Tuluva Isvara Nayaka was a commander of Vijayanagara Empire, South India. He was also the father of Tuluva Narasa Nayaka and grandfather of Viranarasimha Raya, Krishnadevaraya and Achyuta Deva Raya.

He served Saluva Narasimha Deva Raya’s several expeditions with his son Tuluva Narasa Nayaka.

References
 Prof K.A. Nilakanta Sastry, History of South India, From Prehistoric times to fall of Vijayanagar, 1955, OUP, New Delhi (Reprinted 2002)

Vijayanagara Empire
Indian Hindus
Tulu people